

Heat of vaporization

Notes 
 Values refer to the enthalpy change in the conversion of liquid to gas at the boiling point (normal, 101.325 kPa).

References

Zhang et al.

CRC
As quoted from various sources in an online version of:
 David R. Lide (ed.), CRC Handbook of Chemistry and Physics, 84th Edition. CRC Press. Boca Raton, Florida, 2003; Section 6, Fluid Properties; Enthalpy of Vaporization

GME
Kugler HK & Keller C (eds) 1985, Gmelin handbook of inorganic and organometallic chemistry, 8th ed., 'At, Astatine', system no. 8a, Springer-Verlag, Berlin, pp. 116–117

LNG
As quoted from various sources in:
 J.A. Dean (ed.), Lange's Handbook of Chemistry (15th Edition), McGraw-Hill, 1999; Section 6, Thermodynamic Properties; Table 6.4, Heats of Fusion, Vaporization, and Sublimation and Specific Heat at Various Temperatures of the Elements and Inorganic Compounds

WEL
As quoted at http://www.webelements.com/ from these sources:
 G.W.C. Kaye and T. H. Laby in Tables of physical and chemical constants, Longman, London, UK, 15th edition, 1993.
 D.R. Lide, (ed.) in Chemical Rubber Company handbook of chemistry and physics, CRC Press, Boca Raton, Florida, USA, 79th edition, 1998.
 A.M. James and M.P. Lord in Macmillan's Chemical and Physical Data, Macmillan, London, UK, 1992.
 H. Ellis (ed.) in Nuffield Advanced Science Book of Data, Longman, London, UK, 1972.

See also 

Thermodynamic properties
Chemical element data pages